Copa del Rey de Water polo is the second most important competition of water polo played in Spain. Inaugural edition was played in 1986. The tournament is hosted by Real Federación Española de Natación.

Top eight teams at half-season in División de Honor competes in the Copa del Rey. The competition is usually held in mid-February.

Winners by year

Winners by team

See also 
División de Honor
Supercopa de España

References

External links 
Royal Spanish Swimming Federation
Winners by year
Venues by year

Water polo competitions in Spain